Seychelles International Safari Air Limited (SISA), operating as Seychelles International Airways (SIA) was a charter airline based on Mahé in Seychelles.

The airline commenced operations on non-scheduled routes from the Seychelles to Basel (Switzerland) and Cologne/Bonn (Germany) on behalf of tour operator African Safari Club with one Douglas DC-8-53 (S7-SIA) on 2 November 1982. This aircraft was replaced by a DC-8-63 (S7-SIS) in December 1983. SISA ceased operations in July 1986.

References

Defunct airlines of Seychelles
Airlines established in 1982
Airlines disestablished in 1986
1982 establishments in Seychelles